Bhagyavantha is a 1981 Indian Kannada-language drama film directed and written by B. S. Ranga. The film featured Master Lohit, Aarathi and Jai Jagadish in pivotal roles. Veteran actor Rajkumar and Thoogudeepa Srinivas made brief appearances in the film.

The film is a remake of director's own 1954 Telugu film Maa Gopi which itself was a remake of 1953 Hindi film Bhagyawan and its Marathi version Soubhagya. The 1982 Hindi movie Anokha Bandhan based on the story Ramer Sumati by Sarat Chandra Chattopadhyay had a similar storyline except for the climax. The movie saw a theatrical run of 28 weeks.

The dialogues and lyrics were written by Chi. Udaya Shankar. Performance of Master Lohith were praised by critics and audience. The film featured original score and soundtrack composed by T. G. Lingappa. The soundtrack included two songs sung by actor Rajkumar.

Cast 
 Puneeth Rajkumar as Krishna (credited as Master Lohit)
 Aarathi as Seeta, Krishna's sister-in-law
 Jai Jagadish as Ramu, Krishna's brother
 Rajkumar Guest appearance
 Sudharani as young Tara
 K. S. Ashwath 
 Balakrishna 
 Kanchana 
 Thoogudeepa Srinivas

Plot 
The movie stars and revolves around the life of Krishna (Puneeth Rajkumar) who is considered as an unlucky child and is shunned by most of his family members except his paternal uncle, his uncle's daughter and his brother's wife.

Soundtrack 
The music was composed by T. G. Lingappa which included a very popular devotional song "Guruvara Banthamma" sung by actor Rajkumar.

References

External links 
 
 Raaga info

1981 films
Kannada remakes of Telugu films
Kannada remakes of Hindi films
1980s Kannada-language films
Indian drama films
Films scored by T. G. Lingappa
Films directed by B. S. Ranga
1981 drama films